The Silly Age is a 2006 Cuban film directed by Pavel Giroud. It was Cuba's submission to the 80th Academy Awards for the Academy Award for Best Foreign Language Film, but was not accepted as a nominee.

This film has been nominated to the Goya Awards as a Best Spanish Language Foreign Film, and has won 5 awards in three different film festivals around the world: a Golden India Catalina for Best Film in the Cartagena Film Festival; Best Art Direction, Best Director and Best Original Score winning the Feature Film Trophy in the Cine Ceará - National Cinema Festival; and the Audience Award (Elcine Second Prize) in the Lima Latinamerican Film Festival.

See also

Cinema of Cuba
List of submissions to the 80th Academy Awards for Best Foreign Language Film

References

External links

2006 films
Cuban drama films
2000s Spanish-language films